Koutsoufliani is a village of the Elassona municipality. Before the 2011 local government reform it was a part of the independent community of Verdikousa. The 2011 census recorded 20 inhabitants in the village. Koutsoufliani is a part of the community of Verdikoussa.

Population
According to the 2011 census, the population of the settlement of Koutsoufliani was 20 people, a decrease of almost 64% compared with the population of the previous census of 2001.

See also
 List of settlements in the Larissa regional unit

References

Populated places in Larissa (regional unit)